Jesús Armamento Dosado  (1 September 1939 – 22 June 2020) was a Filipino prelate of the Catholic Church in the Philippines, who served as the Bishop and then Archbishop of Ozamiz from 1981 until his retirement in 2016. He was the first archbishop of Ozamiz when it was elevated to an archdiocese in 1983.

Biography
Dosado was ordained a priest on 26 May 1966 and became a member of Congregation of the Mission (CM). On 31 October 1977 at the age of 38, he was elevated to a bishop as the titular bishop of Nabala. He became auxiliary Bishop of the Archdiocese of Cebu and then Archdiocese of Cagayan de Oro. Dosado was transferred to the diocese of Ozamiz, and after 2 years, he was elevated as Archbishop. He retired in 2016, become Archbishop Emeritus of Ozamiz.

He died on 22 June 2020. His body is laid to rest inside the Metropolitan Cathedral of the Immaculate Conception in Ozamiz City.

References

External links
CBCP
Catholic Hierarchy 

20th-century Roman Catholic archbishops in the Philippines
21st-century Roman Catholic archbishops in the Philippines
1939 births
2020 deaths
People from Cebu
People from Misamis Occidental
Roman Catholic archbishops of Ozamiz
Roman Catholic bishops of Ozamiz